Craig Andrew McKernon (born 23 February 1968) is an English former professional footballer who played in the Football League for Mansfield Town.

References

1968 births
Living people
English footballers
Association football defenders
English Football League players
Mansfield Town F.C. players
Arsenal F.C. players
Kettering Town F.C. players
Shepshed Dynamo F.C. players
Hinckley Town F.C. players
Oakham United F.C. (Nottinghamshire) players